Elizer was an Indian actor of Jewish descent.

Filmography
Elizer acted in many silent films until he switched to talkies and did this till 1949.

 Ratnavali (1922)
 Paap No Fej (1924) 
 Ra Navaghan (1925)
 Sati Saroj (1926)
 Radha Madhav (1926)
 Diwan Bhamasha (1926)
 Bhagva Zenda (1926)
 Indrajal (1926)
 Dulari (1926)
 Princess Lila (1927)
 Poonam No Chand (1927)
 Gatarnun Lulab (1927)
 Alla Ka Pyara (1927)
 Alladin Ane Jadui Fanas (1927)
 Alibaba Chalis Chor (1927)
 Rajrang (1928)
 Pita Ke Parmeshwar (1928)
 Kusum Kumari (1928)
 Sarovarani Sundary (1928)
 Sinhaka Bachha Sinha (1929)
 Maurya Patan (1929)
 Jakhmi Jigar (1929)
 Dagakhor Dilbar (1929)
 Bagdad No Baharvatio (1929)
 Bilwamangal (1929)
 Sindabad Khalasi (1930)
 Raat Ki Baat (1930)
 Alam Ara (1931)
 Khuda Ki Shaan (1931)
 Draupadi (1931)
 Anangsena (1931)
 Dagabaz, Ashiq (1932)
 Shahi Khazana (1946)
 Lady Robinhood (1946)
 Chalis Karod (1946)
 Chamakti Bijli (1946)
 Roop Lekha (1949)

References

External links
 

Year of birth missing
Year of death missing
20th-century Indian film directors
Indian people of Jewish descent
Indian male film actors